Roland Laudenbach (20 October 1921 – 9 January 1991) was a French writer, editor, journalist, literary critic and scenarist.
He had right-wing political beliefs aligned with the Action Française. 
After World War II he supported keeping Algeria part of France and saw the 1962 recognition of Algerian independence as a betrayal of the people by Christian and Socialist leaders.
He edited or contributed to various literary and political magazines, wrote several novels, and wrote scripts and screenplays for numerous films.

Career

Early years (1921–39)
Roland Laudenbach was born on 20 October 1921 in Paris.
His family was Protestant.
His parents were Henri Laudenbach (8 July 1895 – 7 February 1960) and Lucette Mirman (1 March 1893 – 31 December 1987).
His paternal grandfather, Léon Mirman, was a friend of Charles Maurras of the Action Française.
The actor Pierre Fresnay was his uncle.

World War II (1939–45)

Laudenbach was influenced by the Action Française, and was very close to Antoine Blondin during World War II (1939–45).
He became a literary, theatre and cinema critic, and an outspoken political journalist.
At the start of the German occupation of France he co-edited the literary review Prétexte with Jean Turlais and François Sentein, and was associated with the theater company "Le Rideau des jeunes" led by Pierre Franck, whom he had met through Jean Cocteau.
Prétexte was replaced by Cahiers de la génération in 1941, and its team became the core of the Cahiers français published by the Vichy youth organization.
The Cahiers français attracted nonconformists of the 1930s such as Louis Salleron, Jean de Fabrègues, René Vincent and Pierre Andreu, and followers of Maurras such as François Sentein, Raoul Girardet, Antoine Blondin, Jean Turlais and Roland Laudenbach.

On 31 May 1943 Laudenbach married Hélène Reverdy (3 March 1921 – 2 March 2000).
In July 1944 he was named literary director of éditions du Centre.
The first issue of Cahiers de La Table Ronde appeared in December 1944.
In February 1945 éditions du Centre became éditions de La Table Ronde.

Post-war career (1945–91)
Laudenbach began running La Table Ronde in 1945, a publishing company that originated in the Vichy era Cahiers de la Table de Ronde, the organ of a community organization associated with the right-wing Action Française.
Laudenbach gained the support of the "Hussards", a movement of right-wing intellectuals who attacked existentialism and its mouthpiece Les Temps modernes.
He was also a journalist, writing under the pen-name Michel Braspart, and in 1951 published the novel La Mauvaise carte about Algeria.
He was opposed to giving Algeria independence and used La Table Ronde to attack the ideas of General Charles de Gaulle.

A new Protestant newspaper, Tant qu'il fait jour was launched in June 1958 in response to the May 1958 crisis in France caused by an unsuccessful coup attempt in Algeria.
Laudenbach was one of the contributors.
He published an open letter to the Protestant editor Albert Finet on the front page of the new journal saying he and his colleagues were not competing with Finet's established weekly Réforme, but would speak more openly than they could in that journal. 
He wrote, "You are essentially liberal and it is precisely this liberalism (or the direction that it takes in your columns) that does not suit us."

The first edition of the monthly magazine L'Esprit public (The Public Spirit) appeared on 17 December 1960 with an editorial board composed of Raoul Girardet, Jean Brune, Roland Laudenbach and Jules Monnerot. They were joined by Philippe Héduy and the Algerian deputies Philippe Marçais and Marc Lauriol and were supported by military officers opposed to Algerian independence who had to remain anonymous.
The Action Psychologique et Propagande (APP) was the branch of the anti-independence OAS (Organisation armée secrète) charged with popularizing its activities. Jean-Jacques Susini was in charge, supported by Charles Micheletti in Algeria and in metropolitan France by lieutenant Jacques Chadeyron. 
In the summer of 1961 Laudenbach accepted a senior position in the APP.

The Évian Accords of March 1962 ended the Algerian War and recognized Algeria's independence.
Laudenbach wrote that the agreement showed the total bankruptcy of the liberal and left-wing thinkers in France, for which both Christians and Socialists were to blame. 
The Socialists had abandoned the common people of Algiers and Oran, who had supported the French Section of the Workers' International (SFIO) as much as the people of metropolitan France.
The journal Accent grave (revue de l'Occident) was launched in 1963 and ran to less than a dozen issues.
It included Paul Sérant, Pierre Andreu, Michel Déon, Roland Laudenbach and Philippe Héduy on its board.  
The journal followed the ideas of Charles Maurras and had the theme of the crisis of western civilization.

Laudenbach divorced his first wife on 12 November 1969.
On 12 March 1970 he married Huguette du Vivier de Fay Solignac (born 2 May 1928).
Roland Laudenbach died on 9 January 1991 in Paris.

Films

Publications

Notes

Sources

External links

1921 births
1991 deaths
Writers from Paris
French male non-fiction writers
French literary critics
French publishers (people)
French male screenwriters
20th-century French screenwriters
French nationalists
People of the Algerian War
20th-century French journalists
20th-century French male writers